Promicroceras is an extinct ammonite genus from the upper Sinemurian (Lower Jurassic) of Europe, named by Leonard Spath in 1925. Promicroceras is included in the family Eoderoceratidae, which is part of the ammonitid superfamily Eoderoceratoidea.

Shells are evolute with an open umbilicus; strongly ribbed, ribs flattened on the venter, and with small spines without distinct tubercles.

Distribution
Promicroceras species are commonly found in South West England, particularly along the Dorset coast.

Pyritic Promicroceras fossils are commonly found along the coast of Lyme Regis and Charmouth where they are well preserved in the Lower Jurassic (Sinemurian) Black Ven Marl. Fossil shops in the area commonly sell cleaned and polished Promicroceras.

References
Notes

Bibliography
 Treatise on Invertebrate Paleontology, Part L Ammonoidea ; Geological Society of America and Univ of Kansas press, 5th printing,1990. (L345-347)
 Die Ammoniten des süddeutschen Lias. Ein Bestimmungsbuch für Fossiliensammler und Geologe.

External links
 Nature article on promicroceras growth
 Blogs about: Promicroceras Marstonensis

Jurassic ammonites
Early Jurassic ammonites of Europe
Fossil taxa described in 1925
Ammonitida genera
Eoderoceratoidea